The Egyptian Theatre in Delta, Colorado, United States, is an Egyptian Revival movie house.  The 425-seat theater opened in 1928 at the height of the fashion for thematically-designed cinemas. It was designed by Montana Fallis, who designed the Mayan Theatre in Denver.

The Egyptian is notable as one of the first locations for a promotion devised by 20th Century Fox regional manager, Charles Yeager, during the 1930s when business was poor in the small Colorado theaters he managed. "Bank Night" awarded $30 to a random patron once a week. The promotion improved attendance and kept theaters in business. Yeager's pilot program in Colorado was expanded so that by 1936 the promotion was in use at 4000 cinemas in the United States.

After years of decline and neglect the theater was restored in the 1990s, reopening in 1997 as a community theater. It was then renovated again in 2009 to accommodate for new groundbreaking 3D technology.

See also
Egyptian Theatre for other Egyptian Theatres and a discussion of the style

References

Theatres on the National Register of Historic Places in Colorado
Buildings and structures in Delta County, Colorado
Theatres completed in 1928
Cinemas and movie theaters in Colorado
Egyptian-style theaters
Egyptian Revival architecture in the United States
1928 establishments in Colorado
National Register of Historic Places in Delta County, Colorado